The list of ship launches in 1937 includes a chronological list of some ships launched in 1937.

References

Sources

1937
Ship launches